Robert Percy Depledge (1882–1930) was an English footballer who played in the Football League for Everton. He also played for Wallasey Village, Linfield and Wrexham.

References

1882 births
1930 deaths
English footballers
Association football goalkeepers
English Football League players
Everton F.C. players
Linfield F.C. players
Wrexham A.F.C. players